Abijeet Duddala (born 11 October 1988) is an Indian actor and television personality who works in Telugu cinema. He made his debut as a lead actor in the film Life Is Beautiful, directed by Sekhar Kammula in 2012. He starred in the acclaimed web series’ Pelli Gola (2017–19) and Modern Love Hyderabad (2022). In 2020, Abijeet emerged as the title winner of Star Maa’s reality TV show Bigg Boss Telugu 4.

Early life
Abijeet was born on 11 October 1988 in Hyderabad. His ancestors were involved in assisting in the construction of the Charminar. He was enrolled in Chaitanya Vidyalaya for kindergarten. He completed his Schooling from Rishi Valley School, Madanapalle and then completed his Intermediate from Little Flower Junior College, and graduated from Malla Reddy College with a bachelor's degree in aeronautical engineering.

During his final year of college, he casually accompanied his friend to the audition for the film Life Is Beautiful where he was selected for the main lead role by Sekhar Kammula's team. He subsequently was cast as the main lead of the film in 2012, as Amala Akkineni's son.

In 2015, Abijeet attended Northeastern University in Boston, Massachusetts to get a Masters of Science in Engineering Management.

Career
Abijeet made his debut in the Telugu feature film Life Is Beautiful directed by Sekhar Kammula. Next film he signed up was Areyrey, after a song from Happy Days under the direction of Sashi Kiran Tikka, and produced by Neelima Tirumalasetti. The film remains unreleased.

In 2015, he starred in the romantic films Ram Leela, and Mirchi Lanti Kurradu alongside Pragya Jaiswal. Regarding his performance in the latter film, a critic noted that "Abhijit, nevertheless did a decent job and has a high energy in the film. did a decent job in NASA and showcased good energy levels throughout the film. His comic timing is good and he displayed good emotions throughout the film". In 2017, Abijeet made his television debut with Viu's web series Pelli Gola opposite Varshini Sounderajan. The series was successful and he went on to feature in two more seasons.

In 2020, Abijeet entered the fourth season of the reality show Bigg Boss Telugu as a contestant, and emerged as the winner.

Filmography

Television

References

External links

1988 births
Living people
Male actors in Telugu cinema
Indian male film actors
21st-century Indian male actors
Male actors from Hyderabad, India
Bigg Boss (Telugu TV series) contestants